Dennis Henry Herbert, 1st Baron Hemingford,  (25 February 1869 – 10 December 1947) was a British Conservative politician.

Life
Herbert was the eldest son of Reverend Henry Herbert, Rector of Hemingford Abbots in Huntingdonshire. He was elected to the House of Commons as Member of Parliament (MP) for Watford at the 1918 general election, a seat he held until 1943. From 1928 to 1929 he served as Deputy Chairman of Ways and Means and from 1931 to 1943 as Chairman of Ways and Means (Deputy Speaker of the House of Commons). Appointed a Knight Commander of the Order of the British Empire in 1929, Herbert was admitted to the Privy Council in 1933 and on 1 February 1943 he was raised to the peerage as Baron Hemingford, of Watford in the County of Hertford.

Lord Hemingford married Mary, daughter of Valentine Graeme Bell, on 9 June 1902. He died in December 1947, aged 78, and was succeeded in the barony by his son Dennis Herbert. Lady Hemingford died in 1966.

Between 1918 and 1943, Herbert lived in a Victorian villa at 36 Clarendon Road, Watford. This locally listed building was later used as a registry office until it was demolished in 2015 by Hertfordshire County Council to make way for a block of flats and offices.

A 1944 portrait of Herbert by the Scottish painter George Harcourt hangs in the Watford Museum, and there are also photographic portraits of Herbert by the high-society portrait photographers Bassano & Vandyk in the collection of the National Portrait Gallery in London.

References

Kidd, Charles, Williamson, David (editors). Debrett's Peerage and Baronetage (1990 edition). New York: St Martin's Press, 1990.

External links 
 

1869 births
1947 deaths
1
Barons in the Peerage of the United Kingdom
Knights Commander of the Order of the British Empire
Deputy Lieutenants of Hertfordshire
Deputy Speakers of the British House of Commons
Conservative Party (UK) MPs for English constituencies
Members of the Privy Council of the United Kingdom
UK MPs 1918–1922
UK MPs 1922–1923
UK MPs 1923–1924
UK MPs 1924–1929
UK MPs 1929–1931
UK MPs 1931–1935
UK MPs 1935–1945
UK MPs who were granted peerages
Barons created by George VI